Joan Wenzel (born 24 November 1953) is a Canadian middle-distance runner. She competed in the women's 800 metres at the 1976 Summer Olympics.

References

1953 births
Living people
Athletes (track and field) at the 1976 Summer Olympics
Canadian female middle-distance runners
Olympic track and field athletes of Canada
Athletes (track and field) at the 1975 Pan American Games
Pan American Games medalists in athletics (track and field)
Pan American Games bronze medalists for Canada
Athletes from Hamilton, Ontario
Medalists at the 1975 Pan American Games